Sally L. Satel (born January 9, 1956) is an American psychiatrist based in Washington, D.C. She is a lecturer at Yale University School of Medicine, a visiting professor of psychiatry at Columbia University, a senior fellow at the American Enterprise Institute, and an author.

Satel has written: P.C. M.D.:  How Political Correctness is Corrupting Medicine (2001) and Drug Treatment:  The Case for Coercion (1999).

Life
She received a kidney on March 4, 2006, from writer Virginia Postrel, after being diagnosed in 2004 with chronic kidney failure. She wrote an article in The New York Times chronicling her experience of searching for an organ donor. Sally Satel is a resident scholar at the American Enterprise Institute (AEI), a conservative think tank. Her articles have been published in The New Republic, The Wall Street Journal, The New York Times, and in scholarly publications like Policy Review on topics including psychiatry and addiction.

Education
Satel earned a bachelor's degree from Cornell University, a master's degree from the University of Chicago and an MD degree from Brown University. She completed her residency in psychiatry at Yale University between 1988 and 1993. 
In 1993 and 1994, she was a Robert Wood Johnson Health Policy Fellow with the U.S. Senate Committee on Health, Education, Labor and Pensions.

Satel also served on the advisory committee of the Center for Mental Health Services of the Substance Abuse and Mental Health Services Administration.

Viewpoints
In her book P.C. M.D., Satel critiques what she sees as the burgeoning phenomenon of politically correct (PC) medicine, which seeks to address what its proponents view as social oppression by reorganizing the distribution of public health resources.  She argues that incorporating social justice into the mission of medicine diverts attention and resources from the effort to prevent and combat disease for everyone. She is considered a political conservative, a description she rejects.

In a June 2004 meeting of the National Advisory Council for the Center for Mental Health Services, Satel called for an increase in the amount of funding for responsible involuntary care for psychiatric patients who are a danger to themselves or to others, or who are gravely disabled.

Satel supports legally recognizing same-sex marriages.

She supports the medical prescription of opioids such as hydrocodone (Vicodin), oxycodone (OxyContin), morphine or methadone to relieve the pain of patients for whom nonsteroidal anti-inflammatory drugs and other interventions have proved ineffective. Satel acknowledges that such opioids have abuse potential. She points to data showing that people who abuse prescribed medications often have a history of substance abuse, or they are currently in psychological distress or have a psychiatric illness. Data also show they are not typically pain patients who fell unwittingly into a drug habit.
Satel's employer, AEI, has received funding from Purdue Pharma, a company known as the maker of OxyContin, one of the drugs abused in the opioid epidemic in the United States. In numerous articles and appearances on radio and television, Satel has pushed back against indiscriminate restrictions on opioid prescribing. Satel claimed that she was not aware that Purdue had provided funding to AEI and that at she reached her conclusions independently.

Selected works

 1999 – Drug Treatment: The Case for Coercion. American Enterprise Institute for Public Policy Research. [77 p.] .
 2001 – P.C. M.D.: How Political Correctness is Corrupting Medicine. Perseus. .
 2005 – One Nation Under Therapy: How the Helping Culture is Eroding Self-Reliance (with Christina Hoff Sommers). St. Martin's Press. .
 2006 – The Health Disparities Myth: Diagnosing the Treatment Gap. AEI Press. [92 p.] .
 2013 – Brainwashed: The Seductive Appeal of Mindless Neuroscience (with Scott O. Lilienfeld). Basic Books. .

See also
 Kendra's Law
 Laura's Law
 New Freedom Commission on Mental Health
 Outpatient commitment
 TeenScreen

References

External links
 
 

1956 births
Living people
American social sciences writers
American women psychiatrists
American psychiatrists
Alpert Medical School alumni
Cornell University alumni
University of Chicago alumni
Yale School of Medicine faculty
American women academics
21st-century American women
Columbia University faculty